Andrés Faustino Roldán Cordero (born 28 February 1950) is a Cuban former footballer who competed in the 1976 Summer Olympics and in the 1980 Summer Olympics.

Club career
Born in Cienfuegos Province, he played for Azucareros and Cienfuegos, where he retired in 1990.

International career
He made his international debut for Cuba in 1971 and has earned a total of 35 caps, scoring 3 goals. He represented his country in 12 FIFA World Cup qualification matches.

References

External links
 

1950 births
Living people
Cuban footballers
Association football midfielders
FC Cienfuegos players
Olympic footballers of Cuba
Footballers at the 1976 Summer Olympics
Footballers at the 1980 Summer Olympics
Pan American Games medalists in football
Pan American Games silver medalists for Cuba
Pan American Games bronze medalists for Cuba
Footballers at the 1971 Pan American Games
Footballers at the 1975 Pan American Games
Footballers at the 1979 Pan American Games
Cuba international footballers
Medalists at the 1971 Pan American Games
Medalists at the 1979 Pan American Games
People from Cienfuegos Province